Arangattu Parambu is a small village on the way to Pudiyankam from Alathur taluk in Palakkad district of Kerala, South India. It is a part of Pudiyankam Desam. There are some remnants of an old Shiva temple. A legend is that it was a very big temple, demolished during Tippu Sultan's aggression.  There is a small mount nearby  called Pallikkunnu, and a pond near to the remnants of the temple called Pallikkulam.  The word "Palli" is always related to some thing royal or religions.

References

Villages in Palakkad district